Masami Shinoda (1958–1992) was well-known Japanese alto-saxophonist and composer. He began his career in the 1980s and was a member of both Seikatsu Kojo Iinkai Orchestra, and the Japanese band Compostela. His final performance, given in Tokyo in 1992 as a guest saxophonist for the band Cassiber, was released as one half of a double CD called Live in Tokyo (1998).  His sudden death also brought about the end of the band Compostela.

Resources 
Billboard Bio
Bio-site for the band Cassiber.

1958 births
1992 deaths
20th-century Japanese composers
20th-century saxophonists
Japanese male composers
Japanese saxophonists
20th-century Japanese male musicians